Geogepa is a genus of moths belonging to the subfamily Tortricinae of the family Tortricidae.

Species
Geogepa malacotorna (Meyrick, 1931)
Geogepa monticola Jinbo, 2004
Geogepa nigropunctata Kawabe, 1985
Geogepa pedaliota (Meyrick, 1936)
Geogepa promiscua Razowski, 1977
Geogepa stenochorda (Diakonoff, 1948)
Geogepa striatula Razowski, 2008
Geogepa zeuxidia Razowski, 1977

See also
List of Tortricidae genera

References

 , 2004: Notes on the genus Geogepa (Lepidoptera, Tortricidae) from Japan, with description of a new species. Transactions of the Lepidopterological Society of Japan 55 (4): 251–255. Abstract and full article: .
 , 1977, Bull. Acad. Pol. Sci., Sr. Sci. Biol. 25 (5): 325.
 ,2005 World Catalogue of Insects 5

External links
tortricidae.com

Archipini
Tortricidae genera